Temiloluwa O. Prioleau is a Nigerian computer scientist, assistant professor of computer science at Dartmouth College. In January 2019, she became the first black woman tenure-track faculty member in computer science at an Ivy League university. Her research work is on the application of data science to human sensing and healthcare. Prioleau has been recognized for her research on harnessing data from wearable medical devices to understand and improve diabetes.

Life
Prioleau's father was an electrical engineer. She grew up in Lagos, Nigeria, attending a local primary school and later boarding school in Nigeria. She moved to the United States when she was in 11th grade, finishing high school in Texas. She gained a Bachelor of Science in Electrical Engineering from the University of Texas at Austin in 2010 before completing a Masters and then PhD at Georgia Institute of Technology in 2016.

Prioleau was a postdoctoral fellow at Rice University, after which she became an assistant professor of computer science at Dartmouth College, starting in January 2019. She founded and co-directs the Augmented Health Lab at Dartmouth College, and is a faculty affiliate of The Center for Technology and Behavioral Health (CTBH).

References

External links
 Personal website
 

Year of birth missing (living people)
Living people
Nigerian computer scientists
Nigerian women computer scientists
Scientists from Lagos
Dartmouth College faculty
University of Texas at Austin alumni
Georgia Tech alumni
Computer science educators
American computer scientists